Mansour Bahrami and Tomáš Šmíd were the defending champions, but Šmíd did not participate this year.  Bahrami partnered Guillermo Pérez Roldán, finishing runner-up.

Andrés Gómez and Alberto Mancini won the title, defeating Bahrami and Pérez-Roldán 6–3, 7–5 in the final.

Seeds

  Cássio Motta /  Blaine Willenborg (quarterfinals)
  Mansour Bahrami /  Guillermo Pérez Roldán (semifinals)
  Andrés Gómez /  Alberto Mancini (champions)
  Peter Svensson /  Jörgen Windahl (first round)

Draw

Draw

References
Draw

Doubles